National Institute of Pharmaceutical Education and Research, Raebareli (NIPER-Raebareli) established 2008, is an Indian public pharmacy research university running from a transit campus at Lucknow, Uttar Pradesh. It a part of the seven National Institutes of Pharmaceutical Education and Research, under India's Ministry of Chemicals and Fertilizers. The institute offers Masters and Doctoral degrees in pharmaceutical sciences. As an Institute of National Importance it plays an important role in the Human Resource Development for the ever growing Indian Pharmaceutical industry, which has been in the forefront of India’s science-based industries with wide ranging capabilities in drug manufacturing.

The institute offers a 2-year PG degree course; MS (Pharm.) in 3 disciplines ( Medicinal Chemistry, Pharmacology and Toxicology,  Pharmaceutics).(CDRI-Lucknow)Central Drug Research Institute is a mentor institute for NIPER-R and Doctoral program in pharmaceutical sciences with innovation in drug delivery, pharmacology and Bio-pharmaceutics is one of the pivotal criteria.
Facilities are available with CDRI which provides training to the 2nd year masters students and research scholars.

Campus
Institute is running from a transit campus situated in Lucknow's Heera Lal Yadav Institute of Technology and Management campus.

Collaborations
Indian Institute of Technology Kanpur
Sanjay Gandhi Postgraduate Institute of Medical Sciences
Delhi Pharmaceutical Science and Research University
Indian Institute of Technology Roorkee
IDPL Haridwar
FFDC Kannauj
Era University
Babasaheb Bhimrao Ambedkar University

See also
Pharmacy College Saifai
AIIMS Raebareli

References

External links
 Home page

National Institute of Pharmaceutical Education and Research
Universities and colleges in Lucknow
Research institutes in Lucknow
Pharmacy colleges in Uttar Pradesh
Educational institutions established in 2008
2008 establishments in Uttar Pradesh